The 1968 Ole Miss Rebels football team represented the University of Mississippi during the 1968 NCAA University Division football season. The Rebels were led by 22nd-year head coach Johnny Vaught and played their home games at Hemingway Stadium in Oxford, Mississippi and Mississippi Veterans Memorial Stadium in Jackson. The team competed as members of the Southeastern Conference, finishing tied for sixth. After finishing the regular season with a record of 6–3–1, they were invited to the 1968 Liberty Bowl, where they defeated VPI (Virginia Tech).

Schedule

Roster
QB Archie Manning, So.

References

Ole Miss
Ole Miss Rebels football seasons
Liberty Bowl champion seasons
Ole Miss Rebels football